RecordTV Internacional is a Brazilian pay-TV and free-to-air channel that broadcasts 24 hours via satellite and cable with digital parameters, all in Portuguese. RecordTV Internacional is focused on transmitting programs from RecordTV and Record News, except for independent programs abroad. Present in over 150 countries, RecordTV Internacional is received in the United States, Canada, Puerto Rico and across Europe. In Europe, Record is the only Brazilian television to be broadcast free of charge, without any subscription payment. Transmissions are also sent throughout the African and Asian continents, with emphasis on Portuguese-speaking countries. The network has nine satellite signal distribution channels.

The main offices of the station are located in (United States) [Florida],  (Europe) Lisbon, Paris.

Availability

See also
 RecordTV
 Record News

References

External links
 
 
 
 
 

Television networks in Brazil
Television channels and stations established in 2002
Portuguese-language television stations in Brazil
RecordTV
International broadcasters
Mass media in São Paulo
Cable television in the United States
2002 establishments in Brazil